Hog Island, also known as Oak Island, is an island in the Willamette River in Clackamas County, Oregon. It is located within the boundaries of the census-designated place of Oak Grove.

Hog Island is owned by Clackamas County and maintained by a nonprofit group known as Willamette Riverkeeper. It is accessible by boat. The island's native plants include Oregon White Oak, Douglas Fir, Oregon grape, Snowberry, and Camas.

References

Landforms of Clackamas County, Oregon
Uninhabited islands of Oregon
Islands of the Willamette River